I Know a Place is the second album release by Petula Clark, which in the USA (her second on Warner Bros.) charted at #42. In the UK, the album was released as The New Petula Clark Album, a name which was dropped during later re-releases to prevent confusion among record-buyers.

Arranged and produced by Tony Hatch, the album followed on the release of Clark's "I Know a Place" hit single and yielded another UK hit with "You're the One". The latter song was a Top Ten hit in the US for the Vogues and another song introduced by Clark on this album: "Call Me",  reached the US Top 30 via a cover by Chris Montez.

Another album cut: "Strangers and Lovers", is noteworthy as the song Helen Reddy chose to compete with in the televised talent show she won in 1965, her victory marking her move from Australia to the US.

"The 'In' Crowd" was also recorded in 1965 by Dobie Gray, whose version charted in the top-twenty in the U.S. and top-thirty in the U.K.

Track listing
Side one
"Dancing in the Street" (William "Mickey" Stevenson, Marvin Gaye)
"Strangers and Lovers" (Tony Hatch)
"Everything in the Garden" (Roger Greenaway)
"The "In" Crowd" (Billy Page)
"Heart" (Petula Clark, Georges Aber, Tony Hatch)
"You're the One"  (Tony Hatch, Petula Clark)
Side two
"A Foggy Day" (George Gershwin, Ira Gershwin)
"Gotta Tell The World" (Pierre Delanoë, Petula Clark, Tony Hatch)
"Every Little Bit Hurts" (Ed Cobb)
"Call Me" (Tony Hatch)
"Goin' Out of My Head" (Teddy Randazzo, Bobby Weinstein)
"I Know a Place" (Tony Hatch)

CD release
The album was released on compact disc by Sequel Records in 1994. It includes four bonus tracks:
"You'd Better Come Home" 
"Round Every Corner"(The above two tracks were Clark's third and fourth U.S. singles, respectively, that did not appear on LP until Petula Clark's Greatest Hits Volume 1 in 1968)
"Jack and John" (Non-LP B-side of "I Know a Place")
"The Sound of Love" (Previously unreleased)

Personnel
Technical
Tony Hatch - producer, arrangements
Ed Thrasher - art direction
Sherman Weisburd - photography

References

1965 albums
Petula Clark albums
Pye Records albums
Disques Vogue albums
Warner Records albums
Sequel Records albums
Albums produced by Tony Hatch